The 2002 African U-19 Women's Championship was the first edition of the African under-19 women's football championship. The winners of the tournament Nigeria have qualified to the 2002 FIFA U-20 Women's World Cup.

Bracket
Three teams received a bye in the first round.

First round
First leg played between 3 and 5 August 2001. Second leg between 17 and 19 August 2001.

|}

Central African Republic won 3−0 on aggregate.

Mali won 10−1 on aggregate.

Zambia won on walkover after Malawi did not appear for the first leg.

Zimbabwe won on walkover after Botswana did not appear for the first leg.

Morocco won on walkover after Gambia did not appear for the first leg.

Quarterfinals
First leg played between 26 and 28 October 2001. Second leg between 9 and 11 November 2001.

|}

Zambia won 4−2 on aggregate.

Nigeria won 10−0 on aggregate.

Central African Republic won on walkover after Zimbabwe did not appear for the first leg.

Morocco won on walkover after Niger did not appear for the first leg.

Semifinals
First leg played between 25 and 27 January 2002. Second leg between 22 and 24 March 2002.

|}

South Africa won 5–0 on aggregate; Central African Republic withdrew prior to  the second leg.

Nigeria won on walkover after Morocco did not appear for the first leg.

Final
First leg played between 29 and 31 March 2002. Second leg between 19 April 2002.

|}

Nigeria won 9−2 on aggregate.

Qualified teams for FIFA U-20 Women's World Cup
The following team from CAF qualified for the 2002 FIFA U-20 Women's World Cup.

1 Bold indicates champions for that year. Italic indicates hosts for that year.

Notes and references

Notes

References

External links
African Women U-19 Championship 2002 – rsssf.com

African U-20 Women's World Cup qualification
African U-20 Cup of Nations for Women
African U-20 Cup of Nations for Women
2002 in youth association football